William Wilson Killen (1860 – 20 February 1939) was an Australian politician.

Killen was born and educated in County Antrim, Ireland and migrated to Australia with his family in 1876. His father Edward acquired significant pastoral interests, and Killen initially worked on his father's property, "Elsinor", then managed the "Pirillie" property near Bourke. He then acquired an interest in the "Bull Plain" property near Corowa, founding a Merino stud, and purchased the "Merribee" property near Barellan in 1908, where he resided for many years thereafter. He was a co-founder of the Farmers and Settlers' Association and after many years of involvement was its president from 1920 to 1922. He was also president of the Murrumbidgee Shire, a Yanko Shire councillor, vice-president of the Riverina New State League, a member of the councils of the Graziers' Association and Stockowners' Association and a member of the Australian Meat Council, as well as his local pastures protection board. He was an unsuccessful Progressive Party candidate at the 1920 state election.

In 1922 he was elected to the Australian House of Representatives as a member of the Country Party, defeating Nationalist MP John Chanter for the seat of Riverina. In 1925, while a federal MP, he was the official representative of the Riverina movement at the 1925 NSW Royal Commission into the New State movements. Killen held Riverina until his retirement in 1931, having had a heart attack in 1929 and struggled with health issues during his final term.

Killen returned to farming after his retirement from politics and also continued a long-running role as a director of the Farmers and Graziers' Co-operative Grain Insurance and Agency Co. Ltd. He retired to Sydney in his final years. He died at his home in Manly in 1939 after having been ill for several months, and was buried at Rookwood Cemetery.

He married Marion Young, daughter of Victorian colonial MP Charles Young, and they had three sons and one daughter; she predeceased him in 1926. Killen's grandson, David Leitch, was a member of the New South Wales Legislative Assembly from 1973 to 1978.

References

National Party of Australia members of the Parliament of Australia
Members of the Australian House of Representatives for Riverina
Members of the Australian House of Representatives
1860 births
1939 deaths
20th-century Australian politicians